Peace in the Fields is a 1970 French-language Belgian film directed by Jacques Boigelot and based on the eponymous novel by Marie Gevers. It was nominated for the Academy Award for Best Foreign Language Film.

Cast
 Christian Barbier as Stanne Vanasche
 Georges Poujouly as Louis
 Claire Wauthion as Lodia
 Héléna Manson as Johanna
 Arlette Schreiber as Rosa
 Nicole Valberg as Julia
 Lucien Raimbourg as Jardinier
 Vandéric as Aloysius
 Marthe Dugard as Soeur Thérésia
 Josi Jolet as Jules
 Irène Vernal as Fine
 Gilbert Charles as Curé

See also
 List of submissions to the 43rd Academy Awards for Best Foreign Language Film
 List of Belgian submissions for the Academy Award for Best Foreign Language Film

References

External links

1970 films
Belgian drama films
1970s French-language films
Films directed by Jacques Boigelot
Films based on Belgian novels
French-language Belgian films